Jorma Kalervo Inki (born. 1941) Is a Finnish diplomat, a Bachelor of Political Science degree. He has been the Finnish Ambassador in Belgrade 1988–1991. Head of the Administrative Department of the Ministry for Foreign Affairs 1991–1993, Ambassador in Oslo 1993–1999 and in Prague 2003–2007.

References 

Ambassadors of Finland to Yugoslavia
Ambassadors of Finland to Norway
Ambassadors of Finland to the Czech Republic
1941 births
Living people